George Eads (born March 1, 1967) is an American actor, known for his role as Nick Stokes on the CBS police drama CSI: Crime Scene Investigation. He later starred as Jack Dalton on the CBS action-adventure series MacGyver for three seasons.

Biography

Early life
Eads graduated from Texas Tech University (1989) with a degree in marketing. In college, he was a member of the Phi Delta Theta fraternity. Prior to beginning an acting career, Eads worked as a copy machine salesman, as well as selling first aid and safety supplies for Cintas.

Career
Eads drove to Los Angeles, California in a pickup truck borrowed from his stepfather, to pursue his acting career. When he arrived in Los Angeles, he could only drive during the day because the truck had two broken headlights. Eads got his big break on the prime time soap opera Savannah, in which he played the conniving Travis Peterson and later Travis's twin brother, Nick Corelli.

Eads guest-starred as paramedic Greg Powell on ER in 1997 and worked on several made-for-television films such as Crowned and Dangerous (1997).

In 2000, Eads became one of the lead characters of the CBS police drama CSI: Crime Scene Investigation, in which he portrayed a Las Vegas forensic scientist named Nick Stokes.

Parallel to CSI, Eads worked on made-for-television films, such as 2003's Monte Walsh and 2004's Evel Knievel.

In August 2013, prior to CSI 14th season, Eads reportedly took a leave of absence after having an altercation with a writer from the show over what was described as "creative issues". On November 25, 2014, it was announced that Eads would be leaving the show, which in any event was not renewed for the following season; he only missed the series finale television movie, Immortality.

From 2016 to 2019, Eads starred as Jack Dalton in CBS's reboot series MacGyver. In 2018, while the series' third season was filming, Eads asked to be released from his contract so he could spend more time with his young daughter who resides in Los Angeles, as MacGyver is filmed in Atlanta. Producers ultimately agreed with Eads being written out of the show but left open the opportunity for him to return as a guest star in the future. The February 1, 2019 episode "Father + Bride + Betrayal" was his last on MacGyver.

In other media
In March 2009, Eads was voted as one of TV Guides Sexiest Male Actors in the TV Guide's "Sexiest Stars" issue. The "Sexiest Stars" issue voted The Mentalists Simon Baker as the Sexiest Male Actor. Eads was not discouraged by this, however, and said that he was very appreciative of his fans calling him "sexy". "It’s sweet and kind. It makes me want to work harder for them. It makes me want to be sexier."

Filmography

Feature films

Television

References

External links

American male television actors
Male actors from Fort Worth, Texas
Living people
Belton High School (Belton, Texas) alumni
Texas Tech University alumni
20th-century American male actors
21st-century American male actors
People from Tarrant County, Texas
People from Bell County, Texas
Year of birth missing (living people)